Thomas Balch (Leesburg, Virginia, July 23, 1821 — Philadelphia, March 29, 1877) was an American historian, best known for his work on the American Revolutionary War, originally written in French and later translated into English as The French in America during the War of Independence of the United States, 1777-1783.

He was married to Emily Swift Balch (1832-1917) of Philadelphia, Pennsylvania. Mrs. Balch was a member of the Acorn Club of Philadelphia, and the Colonial Dames of America.

Thomas Balch has been called the "father of international arbitration" for his work in popularizing this peaceful mechanism of international dispute resolution (see Thomas Balch Library).

Thomas Balch died March 29, 1877 in Philadelphia, and was buried at the Old Trinity Church.

Thomas Balch Library
In 1922, a library was constructed in Leesburg, Virginia as a memorial to Thomas Balch, a Leesburg native, and was named "The Thomas Balch Library." Thomas Willing Balch (1866-1927) and Edwin Swift Balch (1856-1927), sons of Thomas Balch, originally endowed the subscription library.

Bibliography
 Balch, Thomas, and Thomas Willing Balch. International Courts of Arbitration. Philadelphia: Allen, Lane and Scott, 1915. 
 Balch, Thomas, Thomas Willing Balch, Edwin Swift Balch, and Elise Willing Balch. The French in America During the War of Independence of the United States, 1777-1783. Philadelphia: Porter & Coates, 1891.
 Balch, Thomas. Les Français en Amérique pendant la guerre de l'indépendance des États-Unis 1777-1783. This file was produced from images generously made available by gallica (Bibliothèque Nationale de France) at:  http://gallica.bnf.fr.
 Balch, Thomas, and Daniel McCurtin. Papers Relating Chiefly to the Maryland Line During the Revolution. Philadelphia: Seventy-Six Society, 1857. 
 Balch, Thomas, and Edward Shippen. Letters and Papers Relating Chiefly to the Provincial History of Pennsylvania: With Some Notices of the Writers. Philadelphia: Crissy and Markley, Printers, 1855. 
 Balch, Thomas, and Thomas Willing Balch. Free Coinage and a Self-Adjusting Ratio; A Paper Read Before the Philadelphia Social Science Association, February 23, 1877. Philadelphia: Press of Allen, Lane and Scott, 1908. 
 Balch, Thomas. Calvinism and American Independence. Richmond, Va: s.n, 1876. 
 Balch, Thomas. 1877. "Dr. William Shippen, the Elder". Pennsylvania Magazine of History and Biography. 24: 212-216. 
 Balch, Thomas. The Alabama Arbitration. Philadelphia: Allen. Lanes Scott, 1900. 
 Thomas Balch Library. The Thomas Balch Chronicle. Leesburg, VA: Thomas Balch Library, 1996.

References

External links
 
 
  and at Gallica
 The Balch Family Papers, including correspondence and writings to and from Thomas Balch, are available for research use at the Historical Society of Pennsylvania.

1821 births
1877 deaths
19th-century American historians
19th-century American male writers
People from Leesburg, Virginia
American male non-fiction writers
Historians from Virginia